Harmane (harman) is a heterocyclic amine found in a variety of foods including coffee, sauces, and cooked meat.  It is also present in tobacco smoke.

Chemistry
Harmane is a methylated derivative of β-carboline with the molecular formula C12H10N2.

Sources

See also 
 Harmine

References 

Beta-Carbolines
Monoamine oxidase inhibitors